Nathan Alexander Sales is an American lawyer, academic, and government official who served as the coordinator for counterterrorism and special envoy to the Global Coalition to Defeat ISIS within the U.S. Department of State from 2017 to 2021. Prior to public service he was an associate professor at Syracuse University College of Law, where his fields of research included national security law, counterterrorism law, administrative law, and constitutional law. Sales was also of counsel at the law firm Kirkland & Ellis.

Sales was also delegated the duties of under secretary of state for civilian security, democracy, and human rights between September 2017 and December 2020.

Early life and education
Sales was born in Canton, Ohio. He earned a Bachelor of Arts degree from Miami University and his Juris Doctor, magna cum laude, from the Duke University School of Law. In law school, he was research editor of the Duke Law Journal. Sales was a member of Phi Beta Kappa and the Order of the Coif. He clerked for Judge David B. Sentelle of the United States Court of Appeals for the District of Columbia Circuit.

Career

Sales previously served as deputy assistant secretary for policy at the United States Department of Homeland Security and senior counsel in the Office of Legal Policy. In June 2017, President Donald Trump nominated Sales to serve as Coordinator for Counterterrorism. He was confirmed to this position by the United States Senate on August 3, 2017. In September 2017, he was further delegated the duties of under secretary of state for civilian security, democracy, and human rights by Secretary of State Mike Pompeo. He held this position until December 2020. Additionally, he was appointed special envoy to the Global Coalition to Defeat ISIS in November 2020.

References

External links

 U.S. State Department biography
 Biography at Syracuse Law

Living people
Lawyers from Canton, Ohio
Miami University alumni
Duke University School of Law alumni
21st-century American lawyers
American legal scholars
George W. Bush administration personnel
Trump administration personnel
People associated with Kirkland & Ellis
Year of birth missing (living people)
United States Ambassadors-at-Large